Poblete is a surname. Notable people with the surname include:

Carlos Poblete, Chilean footballer
Elizabeth Poblete (born 1987), Chilean weightlifter
Gerónimo Poblete (born 1993), Argentine footballer
Israel Poblete (born 1995), Chilean footballer 
Maximiliano Poblete (1873–1946), Chilean politician and physician
Olga Poblete, Chilean women's rights activist and feminist
Pascual H. Poblete (1857–1921), Filipino writer and feminist
Yleem Poblete, U.S. government official